The Soviet Union Handball Championship was the highest level for men's club handball in the Union of Soviet Socialist Republics.

The competition was successively dominated by three clubs: CSKA Moscow and its nine titles, including eight between 1973 and 1983 succeeded by MAI Moscow and its seven titles between 1965 and 1975 and then comes the dominance of SKA Minsk and its six titles, including five between 1984 and 1989. These three clubs are also the only three to have won the European Cup of Champion Clubs (respectively two, one and three times).

Field Handball 
In this list is the first Soviet Union Field Handball Championship played with 11 players :

Winners List Since 1962 Indoor Handball 

 The 1991/92 Championship is Officially of the Commonwealth of Independent States.

References

External links
 rushandball.ru

Handball competitions in the Soviet Union
Handball in the Soviet Union